Pak Jong-gon (born 25 March 2000) is a Korean handball player for the Korean national team.

He represented Korea at the 2019 World Men's Handball Championship.

References

2000 births
Living people
Korean male handball players